Hawke's Bay or Hawkesbay is a beach in Karachi, Sindh, Pakistan, located 20 km southwest of Karachi city. The beach is named after Bladen Wilmer Hawke, who owned a house on the beach during the 1930s. The beach is very popular, with hundreds of people visiting daily for swimming, camel and horse riding, and vacations.

Marine Life

This beach is known for being a nesting ground of green sea turtle and olive ridley sea turtle during winter months. Due to this, the World Wide Fund for Nature (WWF) organised a wetland centre on the beach for information regarding turtles.

Hawkes Bay incidents

Various accidents have occurred due to lack of proper security and damaged boats used for giving rides to people.
 In February 1983, a Shia pilgrim drowned near the beach.
 On July 19, 2015, four boys drowned near the beach.
 On September 9, 2017, 12 members of three families drowned near the beach.
 On July 11, 2019, a teenager Kamran (age 14) and an adult Moiz Younus (age 24) drowned while on picnic with family.

See also 
 Hawke's Bay Town
 Mubarak Goth

References

External links

Beaches of Karachi
Tourist attractions in Karachi